Mereki Rose Beach, better known by her stage name Mereki (born March 23, 1985 in Billinudgel, Australia), is an Australian born UK based pop singer.

Early life 
Mereki was born and raised in Noosa Shire, Australia. After moving from Noosa, Mereki briefly stayed in Sweden, then London, Melbourne, New York and eventually settled in Los Angeles. She discovered her passion for music while in Echo Park, California.

Career 
Mereki was first discovered by Grammy-nominated superstar producer Ariel Rechtshaid who signed her. In 2014, Mereki collaborated with Kylie Minogue to release her song “Golden Boy” alongside Nugget, Justin Raisen and Ariel Rechtshaid. Mereki has written songs with and for Phantogram, Kitten, A-Trak, Dan Nigro (Olivia Rodrigo, Conan Gray, Caroline Polachek), Suki Waterhouse and Justin Raisen (Charli XCX, Sky Ferreira). She has also been a featured vocalist and co-writer on tracks with Dhani Harrison, Goldroom, Basenji and Holychild.

While fronting Goldroom, she performed from middle America to NYC to Bogotá, Colombia, before going on to perform with electronic act Flight Facilities as their featured vocalist on the duo’s sold out North American tour. In 2016, Mereki created Mereki’s Clubhouse, a pop-up event platform with a focus on kindness and creating spaces to give a voice to up-and-coming female artists. The Clubhouse motto “Be Kind” grew into a non-profit organization of the same name.

Her debut solo single, “Blue Lake”, was released in 2014. Mereki released a few singles that landed her music in a Victoria’s Secret commercial. In 2017, Mereki released her the Beach EP. The songs on Beach have Mereki’s signature style, a distinctly pop-feel with positive messaging, while tracks like “Spiritual”, “French Kissing” and “Got It All” also hold an ethereal, dreamy quality. In 2022, Mereki released her new single “Presence” and the follow-up track, “Twin Flame”, in 2023.

She also debuted for the first time in the UK at the Glastonbury Festival 2022.

Discography

References 

Living people
1985 births
People from New South Wales
Australian musicians
Australian songwriters